Paplitz may refer to:

 Paplitz (Baruth/Mark), a village in Brandenburg, Germany
 Paplitz (Genthin), a village in Saxony-Anhalt, Germany